Jarl Oskar Wilhelm Andstén (December 7, 1884, Helsinki – July 2, 1943 Helsinki) was a sailor from Finland, who represented his country at the 1912 Summer Olympics in Nynäshamn, Sweden in the 8 Metre.

References

Sources
 

1884 births
1943 deaths
Sportspeople from Helsinki
Sailors at the 1912 Summer Olympics – 8 Metre
Finnish male sailors (sport)
Olympic sailors of Finland
20th-century Finnish people